Careful is a 2017 Indian Malayalam-language thriller film directed by V. K. Prakash. The film stars Sandhya Raju, Saiju Kurup, and Parvathy Nambiar in lead roles. It was released in India on 26 May 2017. The film is a remake of 2016 Kannada film U Turn by Pawan Kumar The film marked actress Jomol's feature film comeback after a decade-long hiatus from film acting.

Cast
Sandhya Raju as Rachana Nambiar
Vijay Babu as SI Ajith Chandran
Saiju Kurup as Ramesh
Jomol as Suja
Parvathy Nambiar as SI Anna Mariyam
Vineeth Kumar as Bijoy
Mukundan as Head Constable Sukumaran
Ashokan as CI Purushothaman
Krishna Kumar as Sudeep
Sreejaya Nair as Mrs. Sudeep
Sreejith Ravi as ASI
Prem Prakash
Tosh Christy as SI Biju
Aju Varghese as Adv. Aneesh Abraham

Reception
Anna M. M. Vetticad of Firstpost called the film "immensely watchable" giving it a rating of 2.75/5. Reviewing the performances of the cast, Deepa Soman of The Times of India wrote: "Sandhya hardly seems comfortable in the skin of a journalist to carry it off convincingly. Sadly for the rest of the actors, the story does not provide any scope for interesting performances". She gave a rating of 2.0/5. A reviewer of Sify rated the film as "an easy one time watch".

References

External links 
 

2017 films
2010s Malayalam-language films
Indian thriller films
Malayalam remakes of Kannada films
2017 thriller films
Films directed by V. K. Prakash